Brigitte Gadient (born 9 October 1963) is a former Swiss ski racer. Her career was as a slalom specialist. She did not win a World Cup race, but finished in second place three times.

Career
During the 1980s, she was teamed with a slalom team of Swiss competitors which included Erika Hess, Vreni Schneider, Brigitte Oertli, Corinne Schmidhauser and Christine von Grünigen. 

She was placed ninth at the 1985 Alpine Ski World Championships, but did not qualify for the 1988 Olympic Games in Calgary.  Gadient retired from skiing following the 1990/91 season.

World Cup results

References

External links
 
 

1963 births
Swiss female alpine skiers
Living people
20th-century Swiss women